Greg Hurst (born 8 April 1997) is a Scottish professional footballer who plays as a striker for New Mexico United in the USL Championship.

Hurst has previously played for Stirling Albion, St Johnstone, Forfar Athletic, East Fife, Berwick Rangers, Stenhousemuir, Chattanooga Red Wolves, Union Omaha and Phoenix Rising FC.

Career
Hurst is from Stirling.

Following a trial with Everton, Hurst signed for St Johnstone in September 2015. He moved on loan to East Fife in 2017, having played as a trialist against his parent club during a pre-season friendly. He was then loaned to Forfar Athletic in January 2018, and back to Berwick Rangers in September 2018.

Hurst left St Johnstone permanently in January 2019, signing for Stenhousemuir. He moved to American side Chattanooga Red Wolves in August 2019.

On 22 January 2021, Hurst moved to USL League One side Union Omaha. He led Omaha in scoring en route to winning the 2021 USL League One championship final.

Hurst moved to USL Championship club Phoenix Rising FC on 17 January 2022.

On 2 December 2022, Hurst was transferred from to New Mexico United for the 2023 season, in exchange for an international roster spot.

Career statistics

Honors
Individual
 USL League One All-League First Team: 2020, 2021

References

1997 births
Living people
Scottish footballers
Stirling Albion F.C. players
St Johnstone F.C. players
Berwick Rangers F.C. players
East Fife F.C. players
Forfar Athletic F.C. players
Scottish Professional Football League players
Association football forwards
Stenhousemuir F.C. players
Place of birth missing (living people)
Chattanooga Red Wolves SC players
Union Omaha players
Phoenix Rising FC players
New Mexico United players
Scottish expatriate footballers
Scottish expatriates in the United States
Expatriate soccer players in the United States